Princess Dina Mired (born Dina Mohammad Khalifeh on 12 October 1965) is a Jordanian humanitarian and health activist. She is a leading global advocate for Cancer Control and Non-Communicable Diseases (NCDs). She was the President of the Union for International Cancer Control (UICC) from 2018 to 2020, and was the first Arab Muslim elected to lead in such a prestigious global post. Princess Dina is the former Director-General of the King Hussein Cancer Foundation.

In September 2011, she was elected to deliver the keynote speech on behalf of all civil society at the opening of the United Nations General Assembly first ever high-level meeting on non-communicable diseases (NCDs).

Also, in September 2018, Princess Dina was chosen again to speak at the third high level meeting on NCDs as "Eminent Champion of the fight against Non-communicable diseases" on the prevention and control of non-communicable diseases (NCD's).

Education 
Princess Dina was educated at the National Orthodox School in Amman, after which she continued her education in England at the Westonbirt School for Girls in Gloucestershire where she completed her O and A Level certificates.
Princess Dina holds a BSc in Accounting and Financial Analysis from Warwick University, England (1985–1988) and MSc from Reading University, England (1991).

Career 
President of the Union for International Cancer Control (UICC): October 2018 – 2020

Princess Dina was elected as president of the Union for International Cancer Control (UICC) in 2018, the largest global cancer-fighting organization. A testament to her outstanding leadership, she was the first Arab to have been elected in such a prestigious global post. She was president-elect from 2016 to 2018.

Prior to her presidency at UICC, Princess Dina served as:
 Member of the Presidential Advisory Panel of the Union for International Cancer Control (UICC)
 Ambassador of the UICC World Cancer Declaration Ambassadors Program

King Hussein Cancer Foundation: 2002 – June 2016

Princess Dina established all the core work, structure and function of the King Hussein Cancer Foundation (KHCF) and led the organization from 2002 till June 2016. Princess Dina transformed the non-profit into the most successful grass root fundraiser for all cancer control efforts in Jordan and positioned it into an internationally known brand and leader in development, advocacy, public awareness on early detection and prevention, cancer coverage, and patient support. KHCF became a role model not only in Jordan but also in the global movement for people affected by cancer.

Local Advocacy for Cancer Control

Princess Dina is a leading national and global figure in advocacy work on behalf of cancer patients and their families.

Princess Dina served as the Honorary Chairperson of the Jordan Breast Cancer Program (JBCP) 2006–2016. To date, JBCP remains the most successful national early detection and screening program saving the lives of thousands of women.

Princess Dina is a fierce advocate in the fight against tobacco, both in Jordan and globally.

Global Advocacy for Cancer Control
 Globally, Princess Dina is a well-known and respected advocate for Cancer Control and Non-Communicable Diseases.
 In September 2011, Princess Dina was elected to deliver the keynote speech on behalf of all civil society at the opening of the United Nations General Assembly 1st ever high-level meeting on non-communicable diseases (NCDs).
 In September 2018, Princess Dina was chosen again to speak at the third high level meeting on NCDs as “Eminent Champion of the fight against Non-communicable diseases” on the prevention and control of non-communicable diseases (NCD's).

High-profile international roles:
 Member of the Expert Group for the Elimination of Cervical Cancer Initiative(Current).
 Honorary Ambassador of Harvard Global Health Win-Win initiative (Current).
 Member of WHO Civil Society Working Group on Non-Communicable Diseases (NCDs)(Current).
 Global Ambassador for Tobacco Free Portfolios (Current)
 Honorary Member of the Mediterranean Task Force for Cancer Control in Italy (Current)
 Honorary President of Harvard University Global Task Force for Expanded Access to Cancer Control and Care in the Developing World (2009–2013)
 Ambassador for the Global Smoke-free Worksite Challenge
 Member of the advisory board of NCD child

Awards and honors 
 2018: Awarded the prestigious Arab Woman Award 2018 for her "Achievements in Global Leadership in Cancer Control" by London Arabia organization that honors and recognizes Arab women who have made a noteworthy impact in different areas on not only the lives of everyone in their community but also around the globe.
 2018 Conferred the title of honorary doctor by the Medical University of Asunción-Paraguay, in recognition of her global efforts in the fight against cancer.
 2017:  Awarded the "Female of the year 2017- Golden Award for Excellence" by the Arab Women Council, in recognition of her outstanding efforts in the field of social responsibility in the Arab World.
 2016 Conferred the title of honorary doctor by Yerevan State Medical University (YSMU) in Armenia, in recognition of her global efforts in the fight against cancer.
 2016: Chosen for Susan G Komen's first ever More than Pink list of those who have made significant impact in the fight to end breast cancer.
 2016 Oct to be awarded the "Personality of the 2016 in the fight against breast cancer" by Zahra Breast Cancer Association of Saudi Arabia.
 2015 Recipient of the International Agency for Research on Cancer (IARC) medal of Honor in recognition of your outstanding leadership and advocacy for cancer control worldwide.

Publications 
 "The Challenges Of Providing Access To Cancer Care: Jordan, A Success Story From The Heart Of The Developing World". Cancer Control-Cancer Care in emerging health systems, 2013.
 "Why Are We So Meek in Demanding Treatment for Non-Communicable Disease?". Huffington Post, 2012.
 "Paying a Heavy Price". Deloitte ME, ME POV issue 3.2010.
 Farmer, P., Frenk, J., Knaul, F. M., Shulman, L. N., Alleyne, G., Armstrong, L., . . . Seffrin, J. R. (2010). Expansion of cancer care and control in countries of low and middle income: A call to action. The Lancet, 376(9747), 1186–1193. doi:10.1016/s0140-6736(10)61152-x
 "World no tobacco day…where are we now? Reflections through the smoke screen". Global Bridges Blog,  2014.
 "Fighting the other cancer…the cancer of shame", Ammon news, July 2013.

Personal life 
On 1 July 1992 in Amman, Dina married Prince Mired bin Ra'ad, the son of Prince Ra'ad bin Zeid and Princess Majda Ra'ad. They have three children:

 Princess Shirin bint Mired (born on 19 May 1993 in Amman). She married Jafer Mohammed Nabulsi on 4 October 2021 in a Katb El-Kitab ceremony at Prince Mired bin Ra'ad home. 
 Prince Rakan bin Mired (born on 20 November 1995 in Amman).
 Prince Jafar bin Mired (born on 4 September 2002 in Amman).

As a mother of a cancer survivor, this inspired her work in cancer research, control and prevention.

Princess Dina played basketball throughout her schooling and university life.

References 

1965 births
Living people
House of Hashim
Jordanian princesses
Iraqi princesses
Princesses by marriage
Jordanian health activists
Women humanitarians
Women philanthropists
Alumni of the University of Reading
Alumni of the University of Warwick
20th-century Jordanian people